Spear is a surname. Notable people with the surname include:

Albert Spear (1852–1929), justice on the Maine Supreme Judicial Court and President of the Maine Senate
Allan Spear (1937–2008), American politician and educator from Minnesota
Bernard Spear (1919–2003), English actor
Bob Spear (1920–2014), founding director of the Birds of Vermont Museum, naturalist, birdwatcher and master woodcarver
Burning Spear (born 1945), Jamaican roots rock reggae artist
Clay V. Spear (c. 1914–1974), associate justice of the Idaho Supreme Court
Duston Spear, American artist
Ellis Spear (1834–1917), officer in the 20th Maine Volunteer Infantry Regiment who rose to the rank of general during the American Civil War
Eric Spear (1908–1966), English composer of film music
Harry Spear (1921–2006), American child actor
John Murray Spear (1804–1887), American Spiritualist preacher
John Spear (1848–1921), British Liberal Unionist politician
Joseph Spear (d. 1837), British naval officer
Laurinda Hope Spear (born 1950), American architect and landscape architect
Lawrence York Spear (1870–1950), American naval officer and businessman
Mary Spear (1913–2006), English cricketer
Matt Spear (born 1970), American soccer coach
Mónica Spear (1984–2014), Miss Venezuela 2004
Percival Spear (1901–1982) British historian of colonial and modern South Asia
Richard E. Spear (born 1940), American art historian and professor
Roberta Spear (1948–2003), American poet
Roger Ruskin Spear (born 1943), British musician and artist, founding member of the Bonzo Dog Doo-Dah Band
Ruskin Spear (1911–1990), British artist
Samuel P. Spear (1815–1875), American soldier in the Seminole, Mexican–American War, and American Civil Wars
Terry Spear, award-winning American author
Timothy L. Spear, Democratic member of the North Carolina General Assembly
Tony Spear, American space exploration project manager
Walter Eric Spear (1921–2008), German physicist
William T. Spear (1834–1913), U.S. Republican politician

See also
Speer
Speir
Spears (surname)